is the Japanese language as spoken by the people of Okinawa Islands. Okinawan Japanese's accents and words are influenced by the traditional Okinawan and Kunigami languages. Okinawan Japanese has some loanwords from American English due to the United States administration after the Battle of Okinawa. Okinawan Japanese is a Japanese dialect, unlike the Northern Ryukyuan Okinawan and Kunigami languages (which are, nevertheless, also officially considered as "Japanese" dialects in Japan).

History 
The Ryukyuan languages were once widely spoken throughout the Ryukyu Islands, but saw a decline in speakers as a result of assimilation policies during much of pre-WW2 Japan. This event caused the Ryukyuan people to experience a language shift towards Japanese. In the Okinawa Islands specifically, many learners of Japanese spoke it with a substrate from the Okinawan languages, causing a distinct variety of Standard Japanese to form, known as Okinawan Japanese.

Differences from Standard Japanese 
Okinawan Japanese shares about 70% of its lexicon with Standard Japanese. There are a number of aspects of Okinawan Japanese that are borrowed from Standard Japanese, but have different uses or meanings. For example, a number of verb inflections and words indicating aspect and mood are the same in Standard Japanese and Okinawan Japanese, but have different uses in both. Hazu means "due, scheduled, or supposed to occur", which indicates a high degree of probability in Standard Japanese. Yet in Okinawan Japanese it indicates a much lower degree of probability, more like "probably" or "may occur". In Standard Japanese, the auxiliaries mashou, you, and ou are combined with the particle ne after a verb and used to make a suggestion. An example is ikimashou ne (Let's go). In Okinawan Japanese, this would express a speaker's will. It would mean "I will go" instead.

Particles and demonstratives are another aspect of Okinawan Japanese grammar that differ from Japanese. The particle kara which means "from" or "since" in Japanese, means "as" or "because" in Okinawan Japanese. So, kara is used in Okinawan Japanese where wo or de is used in Japanese.

Some words have different meanings in Standard Japanese. For example, aruku means "go around" or "work" in Okinawan Japanese, but means "walk" in Standard. Korosu means "hit" in Okinawan Japanese and "kill" in Standard.

Many Okinawan youth use words borrowed from Japanese slang, such as mecchaa (very) and dasadasa (country bumpkin).

English borrowings 
Okinawan Japanese contains some English loan words. Examples are paaraa (parlor), biichii paatii (beach party), and takoraisu (taco rice). One word combines the English word 'rich' with the Okinawan suffix -aa to create ricchaa (a rich person).

See also 

 Amami Japanese, the equivalent of Okinawan Japanese spoken in Amami Ōshima
 Okinawan language

References

Bibliography 
 
 
 Heinrich, Patrick. 2004. "Language Planning and Language Ideology in the Ryukyu Islands." In Language Policy 3 (2): 153-179. DOI:10.1023/B:LPOL.0000036192.53709.fc ISSN:1568-4555
 Heinrich, Patrick. "Language Communities of the Northern Ryukyus: Okinawan, Amami, and Kunigami." in Language Communities in Japan, edited by John C. Maher, 43-50. Oxford: Oxford University Press. https://doi.org/10.1093/oso/9780198856610.003.0004

Further reading

 

Ryukyuan languages
Japanese dialects